Charles Carr Clerke (December 30, 1798 – December 24, 1877) was Archdeacon of Oxford from March 9, 1830 until his death. He also served as rector of Milton, Berkshire (now in Oxfordshire) from 1836 to 1875, Canon of Christ Church from 1845 until his death, and Sub-Dean of Christ Church from 1853 until his death.

The son of Sir William Henry Clerke, he was educated at Christ Church, Oxford, matriculating in 1814 at age 15; and graduating B.A. in 1818, M.A. in 1821, B.D. in 1830, canon and D.D. 1847. He was the author of a large number of visitation sermons and addresses, as well as devotional texts and treatises on ecclesiastical law. Clerke was a sponsor of the Library of the Fathers.

References

External links

1798 births
1877 deaths
People associated with Christ Church, Oxford
Archdeacons of Oxford

18th-century Anglican theologians
19th-century Anglican theologians
Canon law jurists
18th-century Anglican clergy
19th-century Anglican clergy
Sermon writers
Early modern Christian devotional writers
Modern Christian devotional writers